Tarata District is one of eight districts of Tarata Province in Peru.

Geography 
The Barroso mountain range traverses the district. Some of the highest mountains of the district are listed below:

References